The Warlock of Firetop Mountain is an action game published by Crystal Computing in 1984 for the ZX Spectrum home computer. It is loosely based on the adventure gamebook of the same name (the first in the Fighting Fantasy series) written by Steve Jackson and Ian Livingstone, and published by Puffin Books in 1982.

The game was sold both as a regular cassette-only release, and (at a higher price) as a "software pack" edition that included a copy of the original Fighting Fantasy title.

Gameplay
As a third-person arcade adventure game, the player takes the role of an adventurer on a quest to find the treasure of a powerful warlock, hidden deep within Firetop Mountain. The treasure is stored in a chest with fifteen locks, with the keys guarded by various monsters (e.g. orcs, slime moulds and spiders) in the dungeons of Firetop Mountain. The adventurer (equipped with a bow and a sword) must attempt to retrieve the keys, with an added feature (over the game's predecessor, Halls of the Things) being the ability to open and close doors to block the path of pursuing monsters. Gameplay varies with each new game as the maze is randomly generated.

Development
The Warlock of Firetop Mountain was announced in issue two of Micro Adventurer magazine, which  published a feature on the expansion of Penguin Books children's imprint Puffin into the science fiction software market with the video game The Warlock of Firetop Mountain, hoping to emulate the success of the book title. The game was announced as the first in the "Puffin Personal Computer Collection" line together with three other unrelated titles (based on science fiction titles by author Peter K. McBride). 

Puffin contracted Crystal Computing, who had developed the fantasy game Halls of the Things, to create the game. Game designer simon Brattel stated "We ended up doing it quite by accident — we simply bumped into Steve Jackson, one of the authors of the book, in Currys one day — we got talking, he came back and looked at Halls and liked it."

According to hidden text within the game's code the developers only had three weeks to complete the project. The Peter Andrew Jones artwork for the original title was used for the video game cover.

Puffin Books briefly continued the trend of adapting the Fighting Fantasy titles into video games, with early titles The Citadel of Chaos and The Forest of Doom being released for the ZX Spectrum and Commodore 64 respectively.

Reception
ZX Computing described the game as simply a "variation" of Halls of the Things, but praised the inclusion of the book as it encouraged children to read. Micro Adventurer also commented on the similarities, stating that "it is so similar that it would be pointless buying both games".

CRASH magazine criticized the control scheme  (the number of control keys and the developer's decision to use the horizontally adjacent N and M keys to move the player's character up and down) but also claimed the game less difficult and confusing, and with better graphics. Computer and Video Games expressed disappointment that the game had little resemblance to the original Fighting Fantasy title.

References

External links

1984 video games
Europe-exclusive video games
Fighting Fantasy
Single-player video games
Video games based on novels
Video games developed in the United Kingdom
Video games about witchcraft
ZX Spectrum games
ZX Spectrum-only games